Dining Downunder is an Australian cooking show hosted by celebrity chefs – Vic Cherikoff (Executive Producer and show host), Benjamin Christie and Mark McCluskey. The series began airing in 2004 on the ABC Asia Pacific, and ended its run in 2006.

External links
Dining Downunder
Vic Cherikoff
Benjamin Christie

2004 Australian television series debuts
2006 Australian television series endings
Australian Broadcasting Corporation original programming
Food travelogue television series